Sayyid Babar Ali Khan Bahadur (died 28 April 1810) was the Nawab of Bengal and Bihar. He succeeded to the Nawab's Masnad (throne) after his father, Mubarak Ali Khan died on 6 September 1793. He reigned from 1793 until 1810, when he died on 28 April 1810.

Life
Nawab Nazim Babar Ali Khan was born to Mubarak Ali Khan (Nawab of Bengal) and Faiz-un-nisa Walida Begum, one of his principal wives. Babar Ali Khan succeeded his father to the Masnad (throne) after he died on 6 September 1793.

Death and succession
Nawab Nazim Babar Ali Khan died on 28 April 1810 and was succeeded by his elder son, Zain-ud-Din Ali Khan as Nawab of Bengal and Bihar.

Wives and children
Nawab Nazim Babar Ali Khan had two wives. His first wife was Babbu Begum Sahiba. She was the daughter of Muhammad Sami Khan. The name of Babar Ali Khan's second wife is unknown.

Babar Ali had two sons. Zain-ud-Din Ali Khan was the eldest son of Babar Ali by Babbu Begum and Ahmad Ali Khan was his youngest son by his second wife.

See also
 Nawabs of Bengal
 List of rulers of Bengal
 History of Bengal
 History of Bangladesh
 History of India
 Shia Islam in India

External links
   Site dedicated to Nawab Nazim Babar Ali Khan of Bengal, Bihar and Orissa

Nawabs of Bengal
18th-century births
Year of birth unknown
1810 deaths
19th-century Indian monarchs
18th-century Indian monarchs
19th-century rulers in Asia